The Carriage is an opera in one act by composer Vyacheslav Kruglik. The opera uses a Russian libretto by Vera Kupriyanova and the composer which is based upon the story of the same name by Nikolai Gogol. The opera was commissioned by the Mariinsky Theatre along with two other new operas, Svetlana Nesterova's The Lawsuit and Anastasia Bespalova's Shponka and His Aunt, all based on stories by Nikolai Gogol. The three operas premiered together on 21 June 2009 during the Mariinsky Theatre's summer festival.

Roles
General
Chertokutsky, a landowner
Chertokutsky's young wife

References

Operas
Russian-language operas
2009 operas
Operas by Vyacheslav Kruglik
One-act operas
Operas based on works by Nikolai Gogol